In chemistry, volatility is a material quality which describes how readily a substance vaporizes. At a given temperature and pressure, a substance with high volatility is more likely to exist as a vapour, while a substance with low volatility is more likely to be a liquid or solid. Volatility can also describe the tendency of a vapor to condense into a liquid or solid; less volatile substances will more readily condense from a vapor than highly volatile ones. Differences in volatility can be observed by comparing how fast substances within a group evaporate (or sublimate in the case of solids) when exposed to the atmosphere. A highly volatile substance such as rubbing alcohol (isopropyl alcohol) will quickly evaporate, while a substance with low volatility such as vegetable oil will remain condensed. In general, solids are much less volatile than liquids, but there are some exceptions. Solids that sublimate (change directly from solid to vapor) such as dry ice (solid carbon dioxide) or iodine can vaporize at a similar rate as some liquids under standard conditions.

Description
Volatility itself has no defined numerical value, but it is often described using vapor pressures or boiling points (for liquids). High vapor pressures indicate a high volatility, while high boiling points indicate low volatility. Vapor pressures and boiling points are often presented in tables and charts that can be used to compare chemicals of interest. Volatility data is typically found through experimentation over a range of temperatures and pressures.

Vapor pressure 

Vapor pressure is a measurement of how readily a condensed phase forms a vapor at a given temperature. A substance enclosed in a sealed vessel initially at vacuum (no air inside) will quickly fill any empty space with vapor. After the system reaches equilibrium and no more vapor is formed, this vapor pressure can be measured. Increasing the temperature increases the amount of vapor that is formed and thus the vapor pressure. In a mixture, each substance contributes to the overall vapor pressure of the mixture, with more volatile compounds making a larger contribution.

Boiling point 
Boiling point is the temperature at which the vapor pressure of a liquid is equal to the surrounding pressure, causing the liquid to rapidly evaporate, or boil. It is closely related to vapor pressure, but is dependent on pressure. The normal boiling point is the boiling point at atmospheric pressure, but it can also be reported at higher and lower pressures.

Contributing factors

Intermolecular forces 

An important factor influencing a substance's volatility is the strength of the interactions between its molecules. Attractive forces between molecules are what holds materials together, and materials with stronger intermolecular forces, such as most solids, are typically not very volatile. Ethanol and dimethyl ether, two chemicals with the same formula (C2H6O), have different volatilities due to the different interactions that occur between their molecules in the liquid phase: ethanol molecules are capable of hydrogen bonding while dimethyl ether molecules are not. The result in an overall stronger attractive force between the ethanol molecules, making it the less volatile substance of the two.

Molecular weight 
In general, volatility tends to decrease with increasing molecular mass because larger molecules can participate in more intermolecular bonding, although other factors such as structure and polarity play a significant role. The effect of molecular mass can be partially isolated by comparing chemicals of similar structure (i.e. esters, alkanes, etc.). For instance, linear alkanes exhibit decreasing volatility as the number of carbons in the chain increases.

Applications

Distillation 

Knowledge of volatility is often useful in the separation of components from a mixture. When a mixture of condensed substances contains multiple substances with different levels of volatility, its temperature and pressure can be manipulated such that the more volatile components change to a vapor while the less volatile substances remain in the liquid or solid phase. The newly formed vapor can then be discarded or condensed into a separate container. When the vapors are collected, this process is known as distillation.

The process of petroleum refinement utilizes a technique known as fractional distillation, which allows several chemicals of varying volatility to be separated in a single step. Crude oil entering a refinery is composed of many useful chemicals that need to be separated. The crude oil flows into a distillation tower and is heated up, which allows the more volatile components such as butane and kerosene to vaporize. These vapors move up the tower and eventually come in contact with cold surfaces, which causes them to condense and be collected. The most volatile chemical condense at the top of the column while the least volatile chemicals to vaporize condense in the lowest portion. On the right is a picture illustrating the design of a distillation tower.

The difference in volatility between water and ethanol has traditionally been used in the refinement of drinking alcohol. In order to increase the concentration of ethanol in the product, alcohol makers would heat the initial alcohol mixture to a temperature where most of the ethanol vaporizes while most of the water remains liquid. The ethanol vapor is then collected and condensed in a separate container, resulting in a much more concentrated product.

Perfume 
Volatility is an important consideration when crafting perfumes. Humans detect odors when aromatic vapors come in contact with receptors in the nose. Ingredients that vaporize quickly after being applied will produce fragrant vapors for a short time before the oils evaporate. Slow-evaporating ingredients can stay on the skin for weeks or even months, but may not produce enough vapors to produce a strong aroma. To prevent these problems, perfume designers carefully consider the volatility of essential oils and other ingredients in their perfumes. Appropriate evaporation rates are achieved by modifying the amount of highly volatile and non-volatile ingredients used.

See also
 Clausius–Clapeyron relation
 Distillation
 Fractional distillation
 Partial pressure
 Raoult's law
 Relative volatility
 Vapor–liquid equilibrium
 Volatile organic compound

References

External links
 Volatility from ilpi.com
 Definition of volatile from Wiktionary

Physical chemistry
Chemical properties
Thermodynamic properties
Engineering thermodynamics
Gases